Jonathon Duniam (born 31 December 1982) is an Australian politician. He is a member of the Liberal Party and has served as a Senator for Tasmania since the 2016 federal election. He served as an assistant minister in the Morrison Government from 2019 until May 2022, following the appointment of the Albanese ministry. Prior to entering parliament Duniam was a political staffer, including as deputy chief of staff to Tasmanian premier Will Hodgman.

Early life 
Duniam was born on 31 December 1982 in Launceston, Tasmania. He is the son of Mary (née Graham) and Roy Duniam, and is a sixth-generation Tasmanian. His mother has served on the Waratah-Wynyard Council, including as deputy mayor. His maternal grandmother Iris Graham was the first woman elected to the Burnie City Council and an Australian Labor Party (ALP) candidate for the Tasmanian Legislative Council, although she later left the party. His mother's uncle Bob Graham was an ALP state government minister.

Duniam grew up in Somerset, Tasmania, attending Stella Maris Catholic Primary School and Marist Regional College in Burnie. He holds the degrees of Bachelor of Arts and Bachelor of Laws from the University of Tasmania, but has never practised as a lawyer. In 2017 it was reported that his "only job outside of politics has been frying chicken at KFC as a teenager".

Politics
Duniam joined the Liberal Party in 2001 and worked as a political staffer for over a decade prior to entering parliament. He worked as an electorate officer to Senator Paul Calvert (2003–2005), adviser to Senator Eric Abetz (2005–2009), chief of staff to Senator Stephen Parry (2009–2010), and deputy chief of staff to state leader Will Hodgman (2010–2016). Duniam also served as president of the University of Tasmania Liberal Club, as well as holding various party offices.

Parliament
In April 2016, Duniam was preselected in third position on the Liberal Party's Senate ticket for the 2016 federal election, ahead of incumbents David Bushby and Richard Colbeck. He resigned his position with Hodgman the following month. Despite a double dissolution resulting in twice as many seats being vacant, he was the only new Tasmanian senator to win election in 2016.

Duniam served on various Senate committees before being appointed Deputy Government Whip in the Senate in February 2019. After the Coalition's victory at the 2019 federal election, he was appointed Assistant Minister for Forestry and Fisheries and Assistant Minister for Regional Tourism in the Second Morrison Ministry. He relinquished the latter portfolio in December 2020 and was instead made Assistant Minister for Industry Development. He was also made Deputy Manager of Government Business in the Senate and held both positions until May 2022, following the appointment of the Albanese ministry.

In April 2021, while being interviewed by Rita Panahi on Sky News, Duniam claimed that Greens senator, Sarah Hanson-Young, had exposed her young niece to danger by involving her in an environmental protest at a logging work site. The claim was false and Duniam apologised to Hanson-Young. Sky News agreed to pay $40,000, plus legal costs, to settle a defamation action brought by Hanson-Young.

In May 2021, Duniam defeated Eric Abetz for the first position on the Liberal Senate ticket in Tasmania at the 2022 federal election.

Political views
Duniam is a member of the National Right faction of the Liberal Party.

In 2016, Duniam was reported as personally opposed to same-sex marriage but supportive of a referendum on the issue. During the Australian Marriage Law Postal Survey, he stated that he would vote "in accordance with the majority view of the public", subsequently  voting in favour of the Marriage Amendment (Definition and Religious Freedoms) Act 2017.

During the 2018 Liberal Party of Australia leadership spills, Duniam refused to state whether he voted for incumbent prime minister Malcolm Turnbull or challenger Peter Dutton in the first vote. In the second vote days later, he reportedly voted for Dutton against Scott Morrison, with the latter emerging successful.

Personal life
 Duniam had three children with his wife Anisa, whom he met at university, and lived on a "small acreage outside of Hobart". They started a child care centre in Hobart in 2016. His father-in-law Zekri Palushi is an Albanian cardiologist who sought asylum in Australia due to his political activities. His wife is related to other prominent Albanian anti-communists, including Catholic martyr Fran Mirakaj.

Duniam is a Christian and attends the Mount Stuart Presbyterian Church in Hobart.

References

External links
 Official website

1982 births
Living people
Liberal Party of Australia members of the Parliament of Australia
Members of the Australian Senate
Members of the Australian Senate for Tasmania
University of Tasmania alumni
21st-century Australian politicians
People from Burnie, Tasmania